UK Tour may refer to:

 UK Tour, a snooker tour held from 1997–2000, now called the Q Tour
 UK Tour '75, a Thin Lizzy album